was the 14th shōgun of the Ashikaga shogunate who held nominal power for a few months in 1568 during the Muromachi period of Japan.  When he became shōgun, he changed his name to Yoshinaga, but he is more conventionally recognized today by the name Yoshihide. In 1568, Yoshihide became Sei-i Taishōgun three years after the death of his cousin, the thirteenth shōgun Ashikaga Yoshiteru.

Biography
Shortly after having been proclaimed shōgun, Yoshihide died from a contagious disease.  In the same month, Oda Nobunaga marched his armies into Kyoto.  He seized control of the capital. Nobunaga installed Ashikaga Yoshiaki as the fifteenth shōgun.

Family 
 Father: Ashikaga Yoshitsuna
 Mother: daughter of Ouchi Yoshiyuki
 Wife: Yuki no Tsubone

Era of Yoshihide's bakufu
The year in which Yoshihide was shogun is encompassed within a single era name or nengō.
Eiroku (1558–1570)

Notes

References 
 Ackroyd, Joyce. (1982) Lessons from History: The Tokushi Yoron. Brisbane: University of Queensland Press.  ;  OCLC 7574544
 Titsingh, Isaac. (1834). Nihon Ōdai Ichiran; ou,  Annales des empereurs du Japon.  Paris: Royal Asiatic Society, Oriental Translation Fund of Great Britain and Ireland. OCLC 585069

Ashikaga shōguns
1538 births
1568 deaths
16th-century shōguns
Yoshihide